Achille Togliani (16 January 1924 in Pomponesco, province of Mantua – 12 August 1995) was an Italian singer and actor. He was a participant in the first Sanremo Music Festival in 1951.

Achille's version of the song 'Parlami d'amore Mariù' was used in the commercial of the perfume Light Blue of Dolce & Gabbana.

Selected filmography
 I'm the Hero (1952)
 Naples Is Always Naples (1954)
 Tears of Love (1954)

External links
 

1924 births
1995 deaths
Actors from the Province of Mantua
Centro Sperimentale di Cinematografia alumni
20th-century Italian male actors
20th-century Italian  male singers